Nabokov's Dozen (1958) a collection of 13 short stories by Vladimir Nabokov previously published in American magazines. (Nine of them also previously appeared in Nine Stories.)

All were later reprinted within The Stories of Vladimir Nabokov.

Two stories, First Love (as Colette) and Mademoiselle O are also included in Nabokov's Speak, Memory.

Contents
"Spring in Fialta"
"A Forgotten Poet"
"First Love"
"Signs and Symbols"
"The Assistant Producer"
"The Aurelian"
"Cloud, Castle, Lake"
"Conversation Piece, 1945"
"That in Aleppo Once..."
"Time and Ebb"
"Scenes from the Life of a Double Monster"
"Mademoiselle O"
"Lance"

1958 short story collections
Short story collections by Vladimir Nabokov
Doubleday (publisher) books